Highland Park is a village in Polk County, Florida, United States. The population was 230 at the 2010 census. It is part of the Lakeland–Winter Haven Metropolitan Statistical Area.

Geography and climate

Highland Park is located in the humid subtropical zone of (Köppen climate classification: Cfa).

Demographics

At the 2000 census, there were 244 people, 112 households and 73 families residing in the village. The racial makeup of the village was 94.26% White, 0.82% African American, 3.69% Asian, and 1.23% from two or more races. Hispanic or Latino of any race were 0.82% of the population.

There were 112 households, of which 18.8% had children under the age of 18 living with them, 62.5% were married couples living together, 0.9% had a female householder with no husband present, and 34.8% were non-families. 31.3% of all households were made up of individuals, and 19.6% had someone living alone who was 65 years of age or older. The average household size was 2.18 and the average family size was 2.70.

16.8% of the population were under the age of 18, 6.1% from 18 to 24, 18.4% from 25 to 44, 26.2% from 45 to 64, and 32.4% who were 65 years of age or older.  The median age was 51 years. For every 100 females, there were 90.6 males.  For every 100 females age 18 and over, there were 84.5 males.

The median household income was $41,875 and the median family income was $56,667. Males had a median income of $43,333 vand females $18,750. The per capita income was $30,097. None of the families and 3.9% of the population were living below the poverty line.

Transportation

  State Road 17 – The Scenic Highway two miles west of the village, leading northward to Lake Wales and southward to Hillcrest Heights and Frostproof.
  US 27 – A four-lane divided highway four miles west.

References

External links
Village website

Villages in Polk County, Florida
Villages in Florida